Immortal Records was an American independent record label/imprint label based in Los Angeles, California. The company helped launch the careers of such influential acts as Korn, Thirty Seconds To Mars, and Incubus over the years. The label had also released soundtracks, including Judgment Night, Spawn, Blade II and Masters of Horror.  It was distributed by various labels, including Epic, Virgin and RED Distribution.

History 
Immortal Records was founded in 1991 by Amanda Scheer Demme and Happy Walters. Shortly after its inception, the label signed a three-year deal with Epic Records. The label also renewed its contract with the label in 1994 for two years further.

In 1997, following the expiration of their two-year renewal Epic re-signed a new five-year deal with the label worth $35 million. The deal granted the label, more creative freedoms, and around this time the label grew its staff from 15 to 20 employees. However, in 1998 the head of Epic, Richard Griffiths, was fired from his position, and relations between Epic and Immortal began to sour. They eventually agreed to separate, with Epic retaining the rights to Korn and Incubus.

In September 1999, Immortal signed a five-year deal with Virgin Records. Virgin's deal with the label was intended to help the label gain new rock acts. The first signing under the new deal was punk rock band U.S. Crush. The deal was severed in late 2002 after the exits of the executives who signed the label's 1999 distribution deal. Virgin kept Thirty Seconds To Mars on the label.

In August 2003, Immortal signed a deal with RED Distribution.

The company ceased operations in November 2007. Despite this, its name was still used on albums by Incubus and Thirty Seconds To Mars after the label's closure. The Escape Frame's self-titled album, which was intended to be released on Immortal prior to it going defunct, was released through End Sounds in September 2008.

Discography

See also 
 List of record labels: I–Q
Immortal Records albums

References

External links 
Official website

Alternative rock record labels
American independent record labels
Heavy metal record labels
Hip hop record labels
1994 establishments in California
Record labels established in 1994
Epic Records
Virgin Records